is a former Japanese Nippon Professional Baseball pitcher. He played for the Yakult Swallows from 1985 to 1989, and the Lotte Orions/Chiba Lotte Marines in 1991 and 1992.

External links
Career statistics and player information from Baseball-Reference

1964 births
Living people
Japanese baseball players
Nippon Professional Baseball pitchers
Yakult Swallows players
Lotte Orions players
Chiba Lotte Marines players
Japanese baseball coaches
Nippon Professional Baseball coaches